Christian Arnesen (26 July 1890 – 18 November 1956) was a Norwegian wrestler. He competed in the featherweight event at the 1912 Summer Olympics.

References

External links
 

1890 births
1956 deaths
Olympic wrestlers of Norway
Wrestlers at the 1912 Summer Olympics
Norwegian male sport wrestlers
Sportspeople from Oslo